Rory Douglas-Speed (born Rory Douglas Speed; 7 April 1992) is a Scottish actor. He studied at Edinburgh Napier University.

Career
Following university, Douglas-Speed was cast in the part of Sick Boy in a stage production of Irvine Welsh's novel (and, later, film) Trainspotting at the King's Head Theatre, in London.

In 2016 he joined the cast of Hollyoaks as Joel Dexter, taking over the role from Andrew Still.

Personal life
Douglas-Speed is in a relationship with Hollyoaks co-star Nadine Mulkerrin. The couple announced their engagement in December 2018 and in June 2019, they announced that they are expecting their first child. Their son was born on 15 October 2019. On 25 December 2021, Mulkerrin and Douglas-Speed announced that they were expecting their second child, and their second son was born on 24 May 2022.

Douglas-Speed has type 1 diabetes.

References

External links

 

Living people
Scottish male soap opera actors
1992 births